The 2002–03 season of the NOFV-Oberliga was the ninth season of the league at tier four (IV) of the German football league system.

The NOFV-Oberliga was split into two divisions, NOFV-Oberliga Nord and NOFV-Oberliga Süd. The champions of each, FC Schönberg 95 and FC Sachsen Leipzig, entered into a play-off against each other for the right to play in the 2003–04 Regionalliga Nord. FC Sachsen Leipzig won 3–0 over two legs and thus gained promotion.

North

Top goalscorers

South

External links 
 NOFV-Online – official website of the North-East German Football Association 

NOFV-Oberliga seasons
4
Germ